12th National Assembly may refer to:

 12th National Assembly of France
 12th National Assembly of Pakistan
 12th National Assembly of South Korea